is a 2003 Japanese documentary film directed by Noboru Kaetsu that follows a 4th grade teacher in Japan.

Synopsis
Children Full of Life follows the life and teaching of Mr. Kanamori, a 4th grade primary school teacher in Kanazawa, Japan. He gives his students lessons on what he considers to be the most important principles in life: to be happy and to care for other people.   His lessons include discussion around teamwork, community, the importance of openness, how to cope, and the harm caused by bullying.

Awards
Children Full of Life was awarded the Global Television Grand Prize at the 25th Anniversary Banff Television Festival, the festival's highest honour and the first time Japan took the top prize.

References

External links

2003 films
2003 documentary films
Japanese documentary films
Documentary films about education
Kanazawa
Education in Ishikawa Prefecture
2000s Japanese films